10 A.M. or variants may refer to:

A time on the 12-hour clock
"10AM / Save the World", a 2018 song by Metro Boomin featuring Gucci Mane
 10 attometres, a very small distance equal to 10−17 metres
 Orders of magnitude (length), a comparative scale regime at 10 attometers

See also
"10 A.M. Automatic", a 2014 single by The Black Keys

Date and time disambiguation pages